The 2023 Ambetter Health 400 was a NASCAR Cup Series race that was held on March 19, 2023, at Atlanta Motor Speedway in Hampton, Georgia. Contested over 260 laps on the 1.54-mile-long (2.48 km) asphalt quad-oval intermediate speedway, it was the fifth race of the 2023 NASCAR Cup Series season.

Report

Background

Atlanta Motor Speedway (formerly Atlanta International Raceway) is a 1.54-mile race track in Hampton, Georgia, United States, 20 miles (32 km) south of Atlanta. It has annually hosted NASCAR Cup Series stock car races since its inauguration in 1960.

The venue was bought by Speedway Motorsports in 1990. In 1994, 46 condominiums were built over the northeastern side of the track. In 1997, to standardize the track with Speedway Motorsports' other two intermediate ovals, the entire track was almost completely rebuilt. The project made the track one of the fastest on the NASCAR circuit. In July 2021 NASCAR announced that the track would be reprofiled for the 2022 season to have 28 degrees of banking and would be narrowed from 55 to 40 feet which the track claims will turn racing at the track similar to restrictor plate superspeedways. Despite the reprofiling being criticized by drivers, construction began in August 2021 and wrapped up in December 2021. The track has seating capacity of 71,000 to 125,000 people depending on the tracks configuration.

Entry list
 (R) denotes rookie driver.
 (i) denotes driver who is ineligible for series driver points.

Qualifying

Qualifying results

Race

Race results

Stage Results

Stage One
Laps: 60

Stage Two
Laps: 100

Final Stage Results

Stage Three
Laps: 100

Race statistics
 Lead changes: 20 among 13 different drivers
 Cautions/Laps: 5 for 34 laps
 Red flags: 0
 Time of race: 2 hours, 53 minutes and 5 seconds
 Average speed:

Media

Television
Fox Sports was carried by Fox in the United States. Mike Joy, Clint Bowyer, and three-time Atlanta winner, three-time NASCAR Cup Series champion and co-owner of Stewart-Haas Racing Tony Stewart called the race from the broadcast booth. Jamie Little and Regan Smith handled pit road for the television side, and Larry McReynolds provided insight from the Fox Sports studio in Charlotte.

Radio
The race was broadcast on radio by the Performance Racing Network and simulcast on Sirius XM NASCAR Radio. Doug Rice and Mark Garrow called the race from the booth when the field raced down the front stretch. Rob Albright called the race from atop a billboard outside of turn 2 when the field raced through turns 1 and 2, and Pat Patterson called the race from a billboard outside of turn 3 when the field raced through turns 3 and 4. On pit road, PRN was manned by Brad Gillie, Doug Turnbull, and Wendy Venturini.

Standings after the race

Drivers' Championship standings

Manufacturers' Championship standings

Note: Only the first 16 positions are included for the driver standings.

References

2023 in sports in Georgia (U.S. state)
2023 NASCAR Cup Series
Ambetter Health 400
NASCAR races at Atlanta Motor Speedway